Pongsak Khongkaew (born 31 January 1977) is a Thai association football and beach soccer player, and a member of the Thailand national beach soccer team, making two appearances in the 2005 FIFA Beach Soccer World Cup.

References 

Living people
1977 births
Pongsak Khongkaew
Pongsak Khongkaew
Pongsak Khongkaew
Association football defenders